Jörgen Bemström (born 6 April 1974) is a Swedish retired professional ice hockey player. In Elitserien Bemström played in Luleå HF, Modo Hockey and Södertälje SK. He ended his playing career in Södertälje SK in 2009, and was named the assistant coach of that team prior to the 2010–11 season. However, after Södertälje's relegation to HockeyAllsvenskan that season, he was forced to leave the club.

His son Emil currently plays for the Columbus Blue Jackets of the National Hockey League.

External links

References 

1974 births
Swedish ice hockey left wingers
Södertälje SK players
Luleå HF players
Modo Hockey players
Living people
People from Södertälje
Sportspeople from Stockholm County